Michel Safra (1899–1967) was a Russian-born French film producer. He was born in the Ukrainian city of Kiev, then part of the Russian Empire. After working in the German cinema for a decade during the silent era, during the early 1930s he began producing films in the French film industry. 

In 1938 he established the production and distribution company DisCina with André Paulvé and produced around thirty films until his death in 1967. He was part of a sizeable contingent of Russian-born figures working in the French film industry during the era.

Selected filmography
 Personal Column (1939)
 The Sharks of Gibraltar (1947)
 The King (1949)
 All Roads Lead to Rome (1949)
 Lady Paname (1950)
 Flesh and the Woman (1954)
 Black Dossier (1955)
 Paris, Palace Hotel (1956)
 A Kiss for a Killer (1957)
 Magnificent Sinner (1959)
 Shéhérazade (1964)
 Gibraltar (1964)
 The Diabolical Dr. Z (1967)

References

Bibliography
 Crisp, C.G. The Classic French Cinema, 1930-1960. Indiana University Press, 1993

External links

1899 births
1967 deaths
German film producers
Ukrainian film producers
French film producers
Film people from Kyiv
Emigrants from the Russian Empire to France